Steven "Steve" D. Black (born 1953) is the former Vice-Chairman of JP Morgan Chase & Co. He previously served as the Co-Chief Executive Officer of JP Morgan, the investment banking subsidiary of JP Morgan Chase. He is a 1974 graduate of Duke University, and has served on the New York Development Council. In October 2009 he was succeeded by Jes Staley.

In April 2020, he was elected to the board of Wells Fargo.

Black and his wife Lyn live in Greenwich, Connecticut.

References

External links 
Forbes.com profile

Living people
JPMorgan Chase people
Wells Fargo employees
Businesspeople from Greenwich, Connecticut
Duke University alumni
1953 births